Fântânele is a commune in Teleorman County, Muntenia, Romania. It is composed of a single village, Fântânele, part of Suhaia Commune until 2004, when it was split off.

References

External links

Communes in Teleorman County
Localities in Muntenia